Calliostoma virescens is a species of sea snail, a marine gastropod mollusk in the family Calliostomatidae.

Description
The height of the shell varies between 10 mm and 15 mm.

Distribution
This species occurs in the Adriatic Sea.

References

 Gofas, S.; Le Renard, J.; Bouchet, P. (2001). Mollusca, in: Costello, M.J. et al. (Ed.) (2001). European register of marine species: a check-list of the marine species in Europe and a bibliography of guides to their identification. Collection Patrimoines Naturels, 50: pp. 180–213

External links
 

virescens
Gastropods described in 1933